Thomas Norman (born before 1400 – 1434 or after), of Canterbury, Kent, was an English politician and brewer.

Norman was not originally from Canterbury, but lived there from 1400 or after. Nothing is recorded of his origin, family or education.

He was a Member of the Parliament of England (MP) for Canterbury in 1421.

References 

14th-century births
15th-century deaths
English MPs December 1421
People from Canterbury